Filip Benković (born 13 July 1997) is a Croatian professional footballer who plays as a centre back for German  club Eintracht Braunschweig on loan from the Italian club Udinese.

Early life
Benković was born in Zagreb, the capital of Croatia, and joined the Dinamo Zagreb academy in 2008.

Club career

Dinamo Zagreb

2015–16 season
On 19 July 2015, Benković made his debut for the club in a 1–1 draw with Osijek. On 22 July, Benković made his European debut in a 3–0 win over Fola Esch in the second leg of the third qualifying round of the UEFA Champions League; playing twelve minutes after coming off the bench as a substitute in the 78th minute. He went on to make a total of 18 competitive appearances for the club in the 2015–16 season.

2016–17 season
On 29 July 2016, in the league match against Slaven Belupo, after Dinamo went 0–1 in the 92nd minute, Benković scored a last-minute equalizing goal in the 94th minute, to make it 1–1. On 10 August, Benković played the full 90 minutes in a 4–0 away win over Hajduk Split. On 23 September, Benković scored the winning goal in a 1–0 win over Lokomotiva. In the mid-phase of the 2016–17 season, Benković was reportedly suffering from injury which would force him to miss the majority of the season.

2017–18 season
On 15 July 2017, Benković scored in a 2–0 win over Istra 1961. On 9 September, Benković scored in a 3–2 win over Rudeš. On 21 October, Benković scored in a 2–2 draw with Hajduk Split. On 4 May 2018, Benković scored a last-minute equalizing goal in a 2–2 draw with Slaven Belupo. On 23 May, Benković came on as a 90th minute substitute in the Croatian Cup Final, as Dinamo won 1–0.

Leicester City
On 9 August 2018, Leicester City confirmed via their official website that Benković signed for the club on a five-year contract, for a fee in the region of £13m. He left the club after mutually agreeing to cancel the remaining term of his contract on 12 January 2022.

Loan to Celtic
On 31 August 2018, Benković joined Celtic on a season-long loan deal. On 14 September 2018, Benković made his debut in a 0–0 draw with St Mirren, playing 60 minutes. Benković scored his first goal for Celtic in a 5–0 victory over Heart of Midlothian on 3 November 2018.

Loan to Bristol City
Benković signed for Bristol City until the end of the season on 31 January 2020. He scored his first goal for Bristol City in a 3–2 win over Derby County on 12 February 2020.

Loan to Cardiff City
In October 2020, Benković joined Cardiff City on a one-year loan.
On 6 January 2021, Benković was recalled by his parent club Leicester City, having only played one game for Cardiff City.

Loan to OH Leuven
Just a few days after being recalled from Cardiff City, Benković was announced by Oud-Heverlee Leuven, arriving on loan from Leicester City until the end of the season.

Udinese
Following his release from Leicester City the previous day, Benković was confirmed as a new signing for Udinese on 13 January 2022.

Loan to Eintracht Braunschweig
On 1 September 2022, Benković moved on loan to Eintracht Braunschweig in Germany.

International career
Benković made his Croatia debut on 11 June 2019 in a friendly 2–1 loss to Tunisia, as a starter.

Career statistics

Honours
Dinamo Zagreb
Prva HNL: 2015–16, 2017–18
Croatian Cup: 2015–16, 2017–18

Celtic
Scottish Premiership: 2018–19
Scottish Cup: 2018–19
Scottish League Cup: 2018–19

Leicester City
FA Community Shield: 2021

References

External links

 
 

1997 births
Living people
Footballers from Zagreb
Association football central defenders
Croatian footballers
Croatia youth international footballers
Croatia under-21 international footballers
Croatia international footballers
GNK Dinamo Zagreb players
Celtic F.C. players
Leicester City F.C. players
Bristol City F.C. players
Cardiff City F.C. players
Oud-Heverlee Leuven players
Udinese Calcio players
Eintracht Braunschweig players
First Football League (Croatia) players
Croatian Football League players
Scottish Professional Football League players
English Football League players
Serie A players
Croatian expatriate footballers
Expatriate footballers in Scotland
Croatian expatriate sportspeople in Scotland
Expatriate footballers in England
Croatian expatriate sportspeople in England
Expatriate footballers in Wales
Croatian expatriate sportspeople in Wales
Expatriate footballers in Belgium
Croatian expatriate sportspeople in Belgium
Expatriate footballers in Italy
Croatian expatriate sportspeople in Italy
Expatriate footballers in Germany
Croatian expatriate sportspeople in Germany